Ensanche Sur de Alcorcón is a new neighbourhood, currently under construction, placed on the South of Alcorcón (Madrid, Spain). It borders on the South with the city of Fuenlabrada and on the South-East with the city of Móstoles. The total area is 1,981,469 m2, including 500,000 m2 for green zones, and around 300,000 m2 for social public purposes.

It will have around 6,000 subsidized houses, and around 1,000 houses with public prices for rental. This supposes the 85% of the total number of houses constructed in this place. All the houses have been designed based on bioclimatic architecture criteria.

See also 
 Neighbourhood association
 Forums with discussions about Ensanche Sur

Alcorcón